Pierre Boudehent (born 6 February 1998) is a French rugby union player, who currently plays as a centre or a wing for La Rochelle in the Top 14 and the Heineken Champions Cup.

Early life
Pierre Boudehent started rugby in Angers, then moved to Nantes in 2013 and finally joined the La Rochelle youth system in 2015.

International career
On 7 November 2022, Boudehent was first called by Fabien Galthié to the France national team for the Autumn internationals.

Personal life
Boudehent is the younger brother of Paul Boudehent, who also plays at La Rochelle as a flanker.

Honours

La Rochelle
 European Rugby Champions Cup: 2021–22

France U20
Six Nations Under 20s Championship: 2018

References

External links
 Stade Rochelais
 EPCR
 All.Rugby
 It's Rugby

1998 births
People from Angers
Living people
French rugby union players
Rugby union centres
Rugby union wings
Stade Rochelais players
Rugby Club Vannes players